Roseville College is an independent Anglican day school for girls, located in the suburb of Roseville, on the North Shore of Sydney, New South Wales, Australia.

The college was established in 1908 by Miss Isobel Davies and has been a member school of The Anglican Schools Corporation since 1967. Roseville has a non-selective enrolment policy and currently caters for approximately 980 students from Kindergarten to Year 12. The College is affiliated with the Association of Heads of Independent Schools of Australia (AHISA), the Junior School Heads Association of Australia (JSHAA), the Alliance of Girls' Schools Australasia (AGSA), and is a member of the Association of Heads of Independent Girls' Schools (AHIGS).

History 
Roseville College was founded in 1908 on its current site in Roseville by Isobel Davies, the daughter of a retired Welsh clergyman. The school started with just seven pupils in a cottage known as "Hinemoea", adjacent to a small playing field.

Principals

Academic 
HSC

The college consistently performs well in the Higher School Certificate (HSC) at a state level.

2021 | 57% of students achieved an ATAR of 90.00 or above, including first in state for food technology and three fourth in State in Japanese Continuers, Japanese Extension and English Advanced. Six Premier's Awards were awarded and, in ten courses, 100% of HSC candidates achieved Bands 5 - 6.

2020 | 63% of students achieved an ATAR of 90.00 or above, with a success rate of 95% for university early admission offers from five leading universities, including 61% in STEM-related fields. The Class of 2020 included first and second in State for Food Technology. In 17 courses, the Class achieved upwards of 30% more Bands 5-6 than the state average*.

2019 | 78% of the college's graduating class were offered a place at the university before completing the HSC, and 58% of students achieved an ATAR of 90.00 or above. Overall, 58% of the Class of 2019 achieved an ATAR or 90.00 or above, with more than a third scoring an ATAR of 95.00 and above, and five students awarded Premier's Awards*.

2018 | 56% of the Year 12 cohort achieved an ATAR of 90.00 or above, with five Premier's Award recipients and two First In State places. More than 80% of total applications to Early Entry university Leadership Programs were successful, with 97% offered - and accepting a place; more than half the cohort pursued STEAM-related disciplines*.

2017 | Roseville College was ranked 36th in the State in the merit list of top schools, 56% of students achieved an Australian Tertiary Admission Rank (ATAR) of 90 or above, 28% received an ATAR of 95 or above, and 68% of the cohort were offered a place at university prior to completing the HSC*.

* Results as available as at time of publishing the college's annual HSC Outcomes document.

Cambridge International Courses

Roseville College is the only school on Sydney's North Shore offering the globally recognised Cambridge International qualifications. The Cambridge International Courses in Physical Science, Global Perspectives and Sociology are offered to Years 9 and 10 students as part of Roseville College's Senior curriculum. Consistently, more than 50% of candidates achieved an A or A+ result in the final examinations, ranking Roseville College candidates strongly against others from around the world, who all studied the same curriculum synonymously.

International Baccalaureate (IB) Primary Years Program

Girls in Kindergarten to Year 6 participate in the International Baccalaureate (IB) Primary Years Program, establishing global learning and innovation through six transdisciplinary units of enquiry.

Scholarships

A range of scholarships are offered for Senior girls in the areas of academics, music and all-round achievement.

Academic Leadership

Each student is given an opportunity to stretch and test herself in both new and familiar areas of learning. The college's personalised learning approach ensures each girl is supported and challenged in her capacity and to her potential. The college's After School Academic Program (ASAP) provides additional dedicated, weekly or fortnightly sessions for students in subjects including English, Mathematics, German, Japanese, Science, Commerce, Business, Economics, History, Senior (HSC) Art, Geography, Legal Studies and French.

Co-curricular opportunities 
Participation through Diversity

Co-curricular activities are varied and include: academic competitions and extra-curricular leadership programs; debating and public speaking groups; community service initiatives; musical tuition, ensembles, bands and orchestras; drama, musical productions and performance groups; photography groups; established programs and international service learning trips, STEAM (robotics, coding and STEM Club), Mock Trial, Duke of Edinburgh's International Award Scheme and Crusaders, and sporting teams.

Dozens of sports are available to senior students at Roseville College, with many offering opportunities for school, regional, state and even national representation. Sports include rowing, tennis, softball, touch football, swimming, netball, hockey, basketball, gymnastics, futsal, athletics, cross-country, and equestrian.

Leadership

Student leadership encompasses every area of school life, most notably in co-curricular activities. Students also participate in formal leadership through the Student Representative Council (Years 7–12), the Buddy Program for Year 7 (Years 10–11), Student Leadership (Years 11–12), Sports and House Captains (Years 11–12), Chapel and Assembly Leadership, community assistance and individual initiatives.

Associated schools 
Roseville College is a member of The Anglican Schools Corporation.

The College is affiliated with the Association of Heads of Independent Schools of Australia (AHISA), the Junior School Heads Association of Australia (JSHAA), the Alliance of Girls' Schools Australasia (AGSA), and is a member of the Association of Heads of Independent Girls' Schools (AHIGS).

The college has relationships with Sister Schools in Japan, UK and NZ.

Japan: The college has enjoyed a 30+ year partnership with Bunka Hugh School, where delegations of students and teachers collaborate to provide language enrichment and cultural exchange in a reciprocal travel experience.

United Kingdom: The college's international exchange partnerships with Gresham's School in Norfolk and Sutton Valence School in Kent, operate annually. Through reciprocal hosting, students live and learn in a different country alongside another girl, while both develop personally to gain an understanding and tolerance of another culture.

New Zealand: The college's international exchange partnership with Waikato Diocesan School for Girls in Hamilton operates annually. Through reciprocal hosting, student take turns to live and learn alongside another girl in her country of origin, while both develop personally to gain an understanding and tolerance of the other's culture.

Tanzania: The college has an ongoing relationship with Shalom (co-educational) Junior School and Bunda Girls Secondary School through fundraising and cultural engagement opportunities.

Notable alumni 

Diane Purkiss – author, editor, fellow and tutor of English at Keble College, Oxford (also attended Our Lady of the Rosary Convent and Stuartholme School)
Dr Jane Alver, Class of 1988. Alver is Director of Effectiveness and Engagement at the Australian Council for International Development. A dedicated lawyer, adviser and researcher, she was named as an Australian Financial Review 100 Woman of Influence (2018) for championing change in business and society.
Josi Ellem, Class of 2013. Ellem is a soprano in the Royal Academy Opera, London. Having studied at the Sydney Conservatorium of Music on a Geoffrey William Rothbury scholarship, she earned the highest mark ever awarded to a vocal student for her final recital. She is also a competent cellist and keen composer, and highly accomplished, award-winning vocalist.
Amelia Adams (née Charlton), Class of 1999. Adams is currently a Nine New Senior US Foreign Correspondent, after an initial posting as a European correspondent based in the UK. A career journalist, she is well respected for her insightful and informative reporting style.
Sue Lennox (née Grieves), Class of 1970. Lennix is an environmental educator and social enterprise founder – one of NSW's most esteemed change agents and named the NSW Senior Australian of the Year 2020. For three decades, the co-founder of OzGreen dedicated her life to sustainability projects in more than 1,600 communities around the world including Australia, India, Nepal, Bangladesh, Latin America and East Timor.
Heidi Bayliss (née Brownrigg), Class of 1989. Bayliss is currently the CEO of Mater Hospital.
Jessica Henry, Class of 1985. She is Head of Risk and Governance at the Children's Cancer Institute, alongside an accomplished career in banking and finance, and women's cricket – over 35 years, she has made 500+ appearances in women's grade cricket (winning eleven Clubwomen of the Year awards and six premierships) and is a champion of young women in the sport.
Dr Stephanie Gardner, Class of 2006. Gardneris currently a Science and Technology Australia Superstar of STEM, encouraging young men and women in STEM fields while also working as a Postdoctoral Research Associate at the University of New South Wales’ Centre for Marine Science and Innovation. She studies bacteria in tropical and temperate reef organisms around the world, such as Hawaii, New Caledonia, Tahiti, Sulawesi, Spain, PNG, Fiji, the Cook Islands and Australia's Great Barrier Reef.
Rosemary Marriott AM, Class of 1957. Marriott received her Member of the Order of Australia in 1992 for her outstanding contribution to people with disabilities having established The Merry Makers in 1978. The Merry Makers provides music therapy in signing and dance to children and adults with intellectual or physical disabilities, winning numerous awards including the Australian Group of the Year (1992). Marriott died in 1994, and her legacy lives on in her Merry Makers.
Emma Sholl, Class of 1997. Sholl is currently the Associate Principal Flute (Robert and Janet Constable Chair) with the Sydney Symphony Orchestra. She was one of the youngest musicians ever appointed, working with the orchestra from 19 years old before being awarded Second Flute. Among her early accolades, Emma won several prestigious awards including the National Orchestral Flute Competition (1999), the ABC/Symphony Australia Young Performers Award (2001), and the National Solo Flute Competition (2002). Sholl is also a lecturer in flute at the Sydney Conservatorium, and teachers for the Australian Youth Orchestra and the Australian National Academy of Music.
Lucy Allen, Class of 2013. Allen is an associate lecturer in Transdisciplinary Innovation at the University of Technology Sydney, where she influences thought about the place of analytical thinking, creativity and active learning in tertiary education.
Michelle Cox, Class of 2009. Cox first represented Australia in softball at 18-years of age, winning bronze at the 2012 World Championships. She became an Australian Olympian at the 2020 Tokyo games, scoring Australia's first run in the competition. She also has a degree in accounting from San Jose State University, California, earning Academic All-WAC and first-team All-WAC honours.
Mollie Dive. Australian cricketer

See also 
 List of non-government schools in New South Wales

References

External links 
 Roseville College website

Roseville, New South Wales
Educational institutions established in 1908
Anglican Diocese of Sydney
Girls' schools in New South Wales
Association of Heads of Independent Girls' Schools
Junior School Heads Association of Australia Member Schools
Anglican secondary schools in Sydney
Anglican primary schools in Sydney
1908 establishments in Australia
Alliance of Girls' Schools Australasia